Lone Pine is a historic home and national historic district located near Tarboro, Edgecombe County, North Carolina. The district encompasses eight contributing buildings associated with the Lone Pine tobacco farm complex.  The house was built about 1860, and is a two-story, rectangular, weatherboarded frame dwelling with Greek Revival and Italianate style design elements.  It has a hipped tin roof pierced by two interior chimneys and a hipped tetrastyle portico.  Also on the property are several structures and two contributing frame tobacco barns.

It was listed on the National Register of Historic Places in 1987.

References

Farms on the National Register of Historic Places in North Carolina
Historic districts on the National Register of Historic Places in North Carolina
Greek Revival houses in North Carolina
Italianate architecture in North Carolina
Houses completed in 1860
Houses in Edgecombe County, North Carolina
National Register of Historic Places in Edgecombe County, North Carolina